Adinandra griffithii is a species of plant in the Pentaphylacaceae family.

Description
The tree species is endemic to Meghalaya state in northeast India.

Adinandra griffithii is a small tree confined to Cherrapunji and Shongpung forests.

It is an IUCN Red List Endangered species, threatened by habitat loss. At Cherrapunji in the East Khasi Hills district a cement factory has caused the loss of habitat.

References

griffithii
Flora of Meghalaya
East Khasi Hills district
Taxonomy articles created by Polbot
Critically endangered flora of Asia